George Frederick Harding JP (1858 – 8 July 1927) was an English-born international rugby union player who played club rugby for Newport and international rugby for Wales. Harding was a member of the very first Wales international team that faced England in 1881.

Rugby career
Harding first played rugby for Newport in 1877 during the founding years of the club. Harding‘S first international cap for Wales was also the very first international game in which Wales had competed. Played at Blackheath in 1881, the Welsh team were humiliated in a crushing defeat to a far more organised and prepared English team. Harding was reselected for the very next Welsh game, one of only four players to keep their place, the others being Charlie Newman, Frank Purdon and William David Phillips. Played away from home at Lansdowne Road against Ireland and under the captaincy of Charles Lewis, Wales won the game two goals and two tries to nil. Harding played in the next two matches for Wales, a second loss to England, and the first ever game against Scotland, which also ended in a loss.

Harding's brother Theo also played for Newport and also represented Wales at international level.

International matches played
Wales (rugby union)
  1881, 1882
  1882
  1883

Bibliography

References 

1858 births
1927 deaths
Monmouthshire cricketers
Newport RFC players
Rugby union forwards
Rugby union players from Chorlton-cum-Hardy
Wales international rugby union players
Welsh cricketers
Welsh rugby union players